is a Japanese actress and voice actress.

Career
She entered theatrical company at the age of 4 and started the stage activities. After leaving the group at the age of 10, she continued auditioning after receiving her own audition. In 2006, she belonged to the Hirata Office. She debuted as a voice actress as the lead character Maka Albarn in Soul Eater. On December 31, 2016, she announced that she would be freelance to leave Hirata Office, where she is affiliated. She belonged to Crocodile since August 16, 2017.

Filmography

Anime

Film

Video games

Drama CD

Dubbing

References

External links
  
  
 Official agency profile 
 
 

1989 births
Living people
Japanese child actresses
Japanese stage actresses
Japanese video game actresses
Japanese voice actresses
Voice actresses from Kanagawa Prefecture
20th-century Japanese actresses
21st-century Japanese actresses